Vivien Endicott-Douglas (born December 10, 1990) is a Canadian actress on stage and screen.

Career
Endicott-Douglas is best-known for her role as Marnie in the television series Shoebox Zoo (2004-2005), when she was 14 years old. Her works include films such Finn on the Fly (2008) and the made-for-TV movie Terry (2005), based on the story of Canadian hero Terry Fox. Her performance in the indie film The Shape of Rex (2013) led to a nomination for ACTRA Outstanding Female Performance, and she was also nominated for the Dora Mavor Moore Award for Outstanding Performance by a Female for her role in the Rose Napoli play Lo (or Dear Mr. Wells) (2017).

Personal
Endicott-Douglas is the older sister of actress Hannah Endicott-Douglas.

Filmography

Stage performances

See also
Hannah Endicott-Douglas

References

External links
 

1990 births
Living people
Canadian people of Scottish descent
Actresses from Toronto
Canadian child actresses
Canadian film actresses
Canadian television actresses